Catton is a civil parish in the South Derbyshire district of Derbyshire, England.  The parish contains five listed buildings that are recorded in the National Heritage List for England.  Of these, one is listed at Grade II*, the middle of the three grades, and the others are at Grade II, the lowest grade.  The most important building in the parish is Catton Hall, which is listed at Grade II*.  All the other listed buildings are associated with the hall, and consist of the kitchen garden walls, two stable ranges and a chapel.


Key

Buildings

References

Citations

Sources

 

Lists of listed buildings in Derbyshire